The 1976 Soviet First League was the sixth season of the Soviet First League and the 36th season of the Soviet second tier league competition.

Final standings

Top scorers

Number of teams by union republic

See also
 Soviet First League

External links
 1976 season. RSSSF

1976
2
Soviet
Soviet